Shadoevision is an episode of "The Cinemax Comedy Experiment" that first aired in 1986, and was repeated on Weird TV in 1995. It was hosted, created and produced by Shadoe Stevens.

Plot

Norman Jones is just a run-of-the-mill CPA until he stumbles through a mysterious doorway into an alternate reality onto a spaceship where a talk show that is evolving mankind broadcasts from.

Unfortunately, he left the door open and the entire universe is at risk of being sucked through it. As well, World Control, a shadowy international corporation, has kidnapped Faith in an effort to capture Norman.

Cast

 "Djony Dakota," "Burke," and Dr. Milton Oak - Shadoe Stevens  
 Norman "Norm" Jones - Gil Christner
 Faith Pate' - Kim Zabinski
 Dorley Shrivel - 
 Wiggy Higgins - Ed Freeman
 Nooter Blank - 
 Bjorn Murt -
 Murky Dirge -
 Usher - 
 Singers - 
 Dr. Winston Taylor -

External links
https://archive.today/20061025033014/http://www.shadoe.com/ShadoeVision.htm

1980s American science fiction television series
1986 American television series debuts
1986 American television series endings